Honeycrisp (Malus pumila) is an apple cultivar (cultivated variety) developed at the Minnesota Agricultural Experiment Station's Horticultural Research Center at the  University of Minnesota, Twin Cities. Designated in 1974 with the MN 1711 test designation, patented in 1988, and released in 1991, the Honeycrisp, once slated to be discarded, has rapidly become a prized commercial commodity, as its sweetness, firmness, and tartness make it an ideal apple for eating raw. "...The apple wasn't bred to grow, store or ship well. It was bred for taste: crisp, with balanced sweetness and acidity." It has larger cells than most apple cultivars, a trait which is correlated with juiciness, as theoretically a higher number of cells rupture when bitten, releasing more juice in the mouth. The Honeycrisp also retains its pigment well and has a relatively long shelf life when stored in cool, dry conditions.  Pepin Heights Orchards delivered the first Honeycrisp apples to grocery stores in 1997. The name Honeycrisp was trademarked by the University of Minnesota, but university officials were unsure of its protection status in 2007. It is now the official state fruit of Minnesota. A large-sized honeycrisp will contain about 113 calories.

Genetics
U.S. Plant Patent 7197 and Report 225-1992 (AD-MR-5877-B) from the Horticultural Research Center indicated that the Honeycrisp was a hybrid of the apple cultivars 'Macoun' and 'Honeygold'. However, genetic fingerprinting conducted by a group of researchers in 2004, which included those who were  attributed on the US plant patent, determined that neither of these cultivars is a parent of the Honeycrisp.  It found that one parent was a hybrid of the Keepsake (itself a hybrid of Frostbite (MN447) x Northern Spy) while the other was identified in 2017 as the unreleased University of Minnesota selection MN1627. The grandparents of Honeycrisp on the MN1627 side are the Duchess of Oldenburg and the Golden Delicious.

The US patent for the Honeycrisp cultivar expired in 2008, though patent protection in some countries continues until as late as 2031. Patent royalties had generated more than $10 million by 2011, split three ways by the University of Minnesota between its inventors, the college and department in which the research was conducted, and a fund for other research. The University of Minnesota crossed Honeycrisp with another of their apple varieties, Minnewashta (brand name Zestar), to create a hybrid called Minneiska (brand name SweeTango), released as a "managed variety" to control how and where it can be grown and sold.

SugarBee is an open cross-pollination between Honeycrisp and an unknown variety discovered in Minnesota in the early 1990s.

Agriculture
Honeycrisp apple flowers are self-sterile, so another apple variety must be nearby as a pollenizer in order to get fruit. Most other apple varieties will pollenize Honeycrisp, as will varieties of crabapple. Honeycrisp will not come true when grown from seed. Trees grown from the seeds of Honeycrisp apples will be hybrids of Honeycrisp and the pollenizer.

Young trees typically have a lower density of large, well-colored fruit, while mature trees have higher fruit density of fruit with diminished size and color quality. Fruit density can be adjusted through removal of blossom clusters or young fruit to counteract the effect. Flesh firmness is also generally better with lower crop densities.  Bitter pit disproportionately affects honeycrisps, typically 23% of the harvest is affected.

International growth
As a result of the Honeycrisp apple's growing popularity, the government of Nova Scotia, Canada spent over C$1.5 million funding a 5-year Honeycrisp Orchard Renewal Program from 2005 to 2010 to subsidize apple producers to replace older trees (mainly McIntosh) with newer higher-return varieties of apples; the Honeycrisp, Gala, and Ambrosia.

Apple growers in New Zealand's South Island have begun growing Honeycrisp to supply consumers during the US off-season. The first batch of New Zealand-grown Honeycrisp cultivars being introduced to the North American market have been branded using the "HoneyCrunch" registered trademark. According to the US Apple Association website it is one of the fifteen most popular apple cultivars in the United States.

See also
 Horticulture
 Minneiska (SweeTango), a hybrid of Honeycrisp and Minnewashta (Zestar!)

References

External links

 The Apple that Changed the World (NPR Planet Money)

Flora of Minnesota
University of Minnesota
Symbols of Minnesota
Food and drink introduced in 1991
1991 introductions
Minnesota University breeds
Apple cultivars
American apples